Velo de novia (English title:Veil of bride) is a Mexican telenovela by Televisa produced by Ernesto Alonso and directed by Ernesto Alonso and Raúl Araiza for Telesistema Mexicano. Is original story of Janete Clair and adaptation by Caridad Bravo Adams.

Cast 
Julissa
María Teresa Rivas
Julieta Bracho
Anita Blanch
July Furlong
Blanca Sánchez
Dagoberto Rodríguez
Miguel Manzano
Héctor Bonilla
Sergio Jiménez
Rafael Banquells
Alicia Montoya
Luis Aragón
Beatriz Sheridan
Carlos Monden
Fanny Schiller

References 

Mexican telenovelas
1971 telenovelas
Televisa telenovelas
Spanish-language telenovelas
1971 Mexican television series debuts
1971 Mexican television series endings